Sir William Flamville (c. 1325 – c. 1396), of Aston Flamville, Leicestershire, was an English politician.

He was the only son of Sir William Flamville of Aston Flamville and was knighted before November 1362.

He was a Member (MP) of the Parliament of England for Leicestershire from 1362 to 1391. He was escheator for Warwickshire and Leicestershire for 1376–77 and 1389–90 and was appointed High Sheriff of Warwickshire and Leicestershire for 1379–80 and 1388–89.

He married twice: firstly Katherine, with whom he possibly had 2 sons and secondly Hawise, the widow of Sir Hugh Meynell of Kings Newton, Warwickshire and Langley Meynell, Derbyshire, with whom he had a daughter. Aston Flamville manor passed to his son William.

References

 

1325 births
1396 deaths
People from Blaby District
English MPs 1362
High Sheriffs of Warwickshire
High Sheriffs of Leicestershire
Sheriffs of Warwickshire
English MPs 1366
English MPs 1371
English MPs 1376
English MPs January 1377
English MPs October 1377
English MPs 1381
English MPs May 1382
English MPs April 1384
English MPs 1386
English MPs February 1388
English MPs September 1388
English MPs 1391
Members of the Parliament of England for Leicestershire